Jaimal Singh Padda was a poet, communist activist. He was shot dead on 17 March 1988 in Lakhan ka Padda village, Kapurthala district by Khalistan movement extremists. He was filmed reciting his poem Una Mitterandi Yaad Pyari, before his death, by Anand Patwardhan in his documentary Una Mitterandi Yaad Pyari.

Earlier Life and Activism

Death
During Punjab insurgency, Jaimal Padda had been vocal against both the Sikh and the Hindu fundamentalists. He campaigned against both Sikh and Hindu fundamentalists. His slogan was “Naa Hindu Raaj, Naa Khalistan, Raaj Karega Mazdoor Kisaan” (Neither Hindu state, nor Khalistan, we want the working class to rule). On 17 March 1988, the shooters belonging to Khalistan Commando Force (KCF) shot him right outside his house.

References

See also
Achhar Singh Chhina
Baldev Singh Mann
Chanan Singh Dhoot
Darshan Singh Canadian
Deepak Dhawan
Nidhan Singh Gudhan
Pash
Professor Ravinder Singh Ravi
Sarvan Singh Cheema
Sumeet Preetlari
Teja Singh Swatantar
Punjab insurgency
Communist Party of India (Marxist-Leninist)

1988 deaths
Indian male poets
People from Kapurthala district
Activists from Punjab, India
Poets from Punjab, India
20th-century Indian poets
Indian Communist poets
20th-century Indian male writers
1943 births